State Highway 75 (Karnataka) is a state highway connecting Bhalki and Chincholi in the South Indian state of Karnataka India.It has a total length of .

Route description
The route followed by State Highway 75 (Karnataka)  connecting Bhalki with Chincholi  via Humnabad, Kabirwadi, Chitgoppa, Kodambal, Ainapur, Chincholi, Channur, Rananpur cross, Narnal, Chimmanchod cross, Kanakpur, Chincholi and Chimmaidlai cross.

See also 
 List of state highways in Karnataka.

References 

State Highways in Karnataka
Roads in Bidar district
Roads in Kalaburagi district